Cristian David Núñez Morales (born 20 September 1997) is a Paraguayan professional footballer who plays as a central midfielder for Sol de América, on loan from Lanús.

Club career
After moving to Argentina at the age of eight, Núñez spent his whole youth career with Los Andes. Aged sixteen, he returned to Paraguay to join Cuarta División side Juventud Loma Pytá. Having debuted at the senior level with them, Núñez headed back to Argentina with Vélez Sarsfield in 2016. He made the step into their first-team in January 2018, as he appeared on the substitute's bench seven times during 2017–18 but went unused. In the club's Primera División finale in that season, Núñez made his debut by coming on as a late substitute for Santiago Cáseres during a 1–1 draw with Argentinos Juniors on home soil.

In September 2020, Núñez terminated his Vélez contract a year early in order to sign with divisional rivals Lanús. His first appearance arrived on 25 November in a Copa Sudamericana round of sixteen first leg encounter with Bolívar, as he featured for the full duration of a 2–1 defeat on his continental debut. On 11 February 2021, after no further matches for Lanús, Núñez was loaned to Primera B Nacional with Platense. In June 2021, Núñez moved to Paraguayan club Sol de América on a one-year loan deal.

International career
In November 2019, Núñez received a call-up to Paraguay's U23 squad for friendlies with Venezuela. Months later, Núñez made the final squad for the 2020 CONMEBOL Pre-Olympic Tournament in Colombia. He made appearances against Uruguay and Bolivia as they were eliminated at the first stage.

Career statistics
.

References

External links

1997 births
Living people
People from Villa Hayes
Paraguayan footballers
Paraguay youth international footballers
Association football midfielders
Paraguayan expatriate footballers
Paraguayan Cuarta División players
Argentine Primera División players
Club Atlético Vélez Sarsfield footballers
Club Atlético Lanús footballers
Club Atlético Platense footballers
Club Sol de América footballers
Expatriate footballers in Argentina
Paraguayan expatriate sportspeople in Argentina